Province 5 (V), also called the Province of the Midwest, is one of nine ecclesiastical provinces making up the Episcopal Church in the United States of America. It comprises fifteen dioceses across the six midwestern states of Illinois, Indiana, Michigan, Missouri, Ohio, and Wisconsin. Jane Cisluycis of the Diocese of Northern Michigan serves as President and the Rt. Rev. Matthew Gunter of the Diocese of Fond du Lac serves as Vice President.

Dioceses of Province V

Diocese of Chicago
Diocese of Quincy (formally reabsorbed by Illinois)
Diocese of Eastern Michigan
Diocese of Eau Claire
Diocese of Fond du Lac
Diocese of Indianapolis
Diocese of Michigan
Diocese of Milwaukee
Diocese of Missouri
Diocese of Northern Indiana
Diocese of Northern Michigan
Diocese of Ohio
Diocese of Southern Ohio
Diocese of Springfield
Diocese of Western Michigan

References and external links 
ECUSA Province Directory
Province V website

Ecclesiastical provinces of the Episcopal Church in the United States of America